Madduri Venugopal better known as Master Venu (1916–1981) was an Indian music composer of the Telugu and Tamil cinemas and the father of the actor Bhanu Chander. He was born 1916 in Machilipatnam, Andhra Pradesh, India and died 1981 in Chennai, Tamil Nadu.

Filmography

References
 

1916 births
1981 deaths
Indian male composers
People from Krishna district
20th-century Indian composers
Film musicians from Andhra Pradesh
20th-century male musicians